Interferon alpha-1/13, also known as IFN-alpha-1/13, is a protein that in humans is encoded by the IFNA1 and IFNA13 genes.

References

Further reading

IFNA13 is an interferon gene.